Leeds United F.C. is an English football team.

Leeds United 2010 may also refer to:

Leeds United F.C. Reserves and Youth Team
Leeds United (song), a song recorded by the football team
 "Leeds United", a song on the album Who Killed Amanda Palmer by Amanda Palmer
Leeds - United!, a play in the BBC's Play for Today series, written by Colin Welland